Presika is a settlement in the Municipality of Ljutomer in northeastern Slovenia, right on the border with Croatia. The area traditionally belonged to the Styria region and is now included in the Mura Statistical Region.

The local chapel was built in memory of soldiers that died in the First World War.

References

External links
Presika on Geopedia

Populated places in the Municipality of Ljutomer